The Kering Foundation (previously known as PPR Corporate Foundation for Women's Dignity and Rights) is a foundation created and financed by Kering (previously known as Pinault-Printemps-Redoute until 18 May 2005 and PPR).

Origins
Since 2001, Kering has been engaging with solidarity projects and social cohesion programs by founding the SolidarCité association. In 2009, SolidarCité was replaced by the Kering Foundation.

Organisation
In 2009, PPR Group launched the Kering Foundation. The foundation is financed by Kering for a minimum term of five years. Its executive director is Céline Bonnaire.

Board of Directors
The Board of Directors is under the chairmanship of François-Henri Pinault and is made up of 16 members, meeting twice a year. The Board is made up of three colleges: a Founding Members Board college, a Kering S.A Personnel Representative college and a college of Qualified Personalities committed to women's issues.
The qualified college personalities are:
 Claude Chirac, communication consultant and Chirac's youngest daughter.
 Waris Dirie, former model, writer and founder of the Waris Dirie Foundation against female genital mutilation.
 Salma Hayek, actress, director and producer, member of the V-Day Association’s Board of Directors and Pinault's wife.
 Taslima Nasreen, writer and feminist activist, who denounces the conditions of minorities, in particular Muslim women.
 Nazanine Ravaï, special adviser to the president of Artémis.

Selection committee
The Selection Committee reviews all funding applications submitted to the Kering Foundation by non-profit associations and NGOs, as well as social entrepreneurship projects. It reviews in particular applications for NGO Partnerships, Employee Projects and Social Entrepreneurs Awards. The committee comprises both external and internal members, and meets two to three times a year.

Goals and missions
The foundation's main goals are to:
 Tackle violence against women, comprising domestic and sexual violence, Female Genital Mutilations (FGM), trafficking, forced marriages and honour killings.
 Promote women's empowerment including vocational training, economic self-sufficiency and social entrepreneurship Amongst other things.

The foundation's actions are organized around five pillars.

Local and international NGO partnerships
 The foundation supports local and international  associations projects. For example, since 2009, the foundation has a partnership with Doctors Without Borders for the implementation of welcome centers for women who are victims of violence in Pakistan.
 The foundation also allows any Group employee to seek material, human and/or financial support from the foundation for the benefit of an association in which s/he is a volunteer or member within the "Collaborators’ Projects" framework.
 Finally, the foundation can finance an employee's solidarity leave in countries in need of help (through one of these three partner associations:  Coup de Pouce, Planète Urgence et France Volontaires).

Microfinance
The foundation supports projects which allow, thanks to microfinance services, the development of revenue generating activities for women in order to reduce economic marginalization. In 2011, the foundation became partner with MicroWorld, an online micro lending platform of PlanetFinance Group, the European microfinance leader.

Social entrepreneurs sponsorship
Each year, three social entrepreneurs are selected for the economic viability and the social added value of their projects in favor of women, their families and communities. Each selected project proposer is awarded 15 000 euros, and also receives personal and business sponsoring as well as guidance from a Kering staff member. 
 2010  
 Sakina M’Sa, founder of the Trevo atelier in Paris
 Maria-Teresa Leal, founder of the COOPA-ROCA, a women's cooperative in a Rio's favela in Brazil
 Anne Roos-Weil, co-founder of the Pesinet association, fighting against infant mortality in Mali.
 2012
Sophia Klumpp and Paul Grinvalds, for their social enterprise AFRIPads, encouraging the educational and vocational integration of girls in Uganda through offering washable sanitary pads. This project is sponsored by a Human Resources manager of Bottega Veneta, on communications and human resources strategies.
Delphine Kohler, for her organisation Filles du Facteur, supporting the empowerment of Burkinabian women through the production of crocheted accessories made from recycled plastic bags. This project will benefit from the guidance of a manager of Kering Strategy, on brand positioning and distribution strategy.
Miriam Espinoza and Patricia Marihuen, for the association Relmu Witral, preserving the traditional skills of the Mapuche women weavers in Chile. This project is supported by the Retail manager of Volcom, who will provide help and guidance with the redefinition of the product offer and marketing strategy.
 2018
Beijing Yuanzhong Gender Development Center from China.
Callisto, from United States.
Chayn, from the United Kingdom.
Colori Vivi, from Italy.
du Pain & des Roses, from France.
GENDES, A.C. from Mexico.
Rebuild, Unite and Nurture, from China.

Awareness raising programs
The foundation supports initiatives fostering public information and awareness about violence against women and women's empowerment (education, training, professional integration, Income Generating Activities, etc.) for both Kering employees and the lay public. For example, the foundation has supported the movie, Desert Flower, for its release in 2010 in France: the movie is based on the true story of Waris Dirie, who was born in the Somali desert and who suffered excision before becoming an international top model.

Other projects
The foundation offers its expertise and advice for Kering ’s brands on their solidarity programs and promotes the development of projects which aim to empower women.
For example, Kering Foundation associated with Gucci to create the Spotlighting Women Documentary Awards through Tribeca Film Institute. The three 2011 laureates were: Barefoot Engineers, Justice For Sale, The World Before Her.

In 2012 the three winners are Alia Ruby Blade, Stargazing and The Supreme Price.

References

External links
 

Foundations based in France
Kering
Organizations established in 2009
Women's organizations based in France
Pinault family